The geology of the Rocky Mountains is that of a discontinuous series of mountain ranges with distinct geological origins.  Collectively these make up the Rocky Mountains, a mountain system that stretches from Northern British Columbia through central New Mexico and which is part of the great mountain system known as the North American Cordillera.

The rocky cores of the mountain ranges are, in most places, formed of pieces of continental crust that are over one billion years old. In the south, an older mountain range was formed 300 million years ago, then eroded away. The rocks of that older range were reformed into the Rocky Mountains.

The Rocky Mountains took shape during an intense period of plate tectonic activity that resulted in much of the rugged landscape of the western North America. The Laramide orogeny, about 80–55 million years ago, was the last of the three episodes and was responsible for raising the Rocky Mountains. Subsequent erosion by glaciers has created the current form of the mountains.

Ancestral rock 

The rocks in the Rocky Mountains were formed before the mountains were raised by tectonic forces. The oldest rock is Precambrian metamorphic rock that forms the core of the North American continent. There is also Precambrian sedimentary argillite, dating back to 1.7 billion years ago. During the Paleozoic, western North America lay underneath a shallow sea, which deposited many kilometers of limestone and dolomite.

In the southern Rocky Mountains, near present-day Colorado and New Mexico, these ancestral rocks were disturbed by mountain building approximately 300 Ma, during the Pennsylvanian. This mountain building produced the Ancestral Rocky Mountains. The uplift created two large mountainous islands, known to geologists as Frontrangia and Uncompahgria, located roughly in the current locations of the Front Range and the San Juan Mountains. They consisted largely of Precambrian metamorphic rock, forced upward through layers of the limestone laid down in the shallow sea. The mountains eroded throughout the late Paleozoic and early Mesozoic, leaving extensive deposits of sedimentary rock.

Mesozoic deposition in the Rockies occurred in a mix of marine, transitional, and continental environments as local relative sea levels changed. By the close of the Mesozoic, 10,000 to 15,000 feet (3000 to 4500 m) of sediment accumulated in 15 recognized formations. The most extensive non-marine formations were deposited in the Cretaceous period when the western part of the Western Interior Seaway covered the region.

Terranes and subduction 

Terranes started to collide with the western edge of North America in the Mississippian age (approximately 350 million years ago), causing the Antler orogeny. During the last half of the Mesozoic Era, much of today's California, British Columbia, Oregon, and Washington were added to North America.  Western North America suffered the effects of repeated collision as the Kula and Farallon plates sank beneath the continental edge.  Slivers of continental crust, carried along by subducting ocean plates, were swept into the subduction zone and scraped onto North America's western edge.

These terranes represent a variety of tectonic environments. Some are ancient island arcs, similar to Japan, Indonesia and the Aleutians; others are fragments of  oceanic crust obducted onto the continental margin while others represent small isolated mid-oceanic islands.   

Great arc-shaped volcanic mountain ranges, known as the Sierran Arc, grew as lava and ash spewed out of dozens of individual volcanoes. Beneath the surface, great masses of molten rock were injected and hardened in place.

For 270 million years, the effects of plate collisions were focused very near the edge of the North American plate boundary, far to the west of the Rocky Mountain region. It was not until 80 MA that these effects began to reach the Rockies.

Raising the Rockies

The current Rocky Mountains were raised in the Laramide orogeny from between 80 and 55 Ma. For the Canadian Rockies, the mountain building is analogous to a rug being pushed on a hardwood floor: the rug bunches up and forms wrinkles (mountains). In Canada, the subduction of the Kula plate and the terranes smashing into the continent are the feet pushing the rug, the ancestral rocks are the rug, and the Canadian Shield in the middle of the continent is the hardwood floor.

Farther south, the growth of the Rocky Mountains in the United States is a geological puzzle. Geologists continue to gather evidence to explain the rise of the Rockies so much farther inland; the answer most likely lies with the unusual subduction of the Farallon plate, or possibly due to the subduction of an oceanic plateau.

At a typical subduction zone, an oceanic plate typically sinks at a fairly steep angle, and a volcanic arc grows above the subducting plate.  During the growth of the Rocky Mountains, the angle of the subducting plate may have been significantly flattened, moving the focus of melting and mountain building much farther inland than is normally expected. It is postulated that the shallow angle of the subducting plate greatly increased the friction and other interactions with the thick continental mass above it. Tremendous thrusts piled sheets of crust on top of each other, building the extraordinarily broad, high Rocky Mountain range.

The current southern Rockies were forced upwards through the layers of Pennsylvanian and Permian sedimentary remnants of the Ancestral Rocky Mountains. Such sedimentary remnants were often tilted at steep angles along the flanks of the modern range; they are now visible in many places throughout the Rockies, and are prominently shown along the Dakota Hogback, an early Cretaceous sandstone formation that runs along the eastern flank of the modern Rockies.

Current landscape
In the last 60 million years, erosion stripped away the high rocks, revealing the ancestral rocks beneath, and forming the current landscape of the Rockies.

Multiple periods of glaciation occurred during the Pleistocene Epoch (1.8 million–12,000 years ago), finally receding in the Holocene Epoch (fewer than 11,000 years ago). The ice ages left their mark on the Rockies, forming extensive glacial landforms, such as U-shaped valleys and cirques. Recent glacial episodes included the Bull Lake Glaciation that began about 150,000 years ago and the Pinedale Glaciation that probably remained at full glaciation until 15,000–20,000 years ago. Ninety percent of Yellowstone National Park was covered by ice during the Pinedale Glaciation. The little ice age was a period of glacial advance that lasted a few centuries from about 1550 to 1860. For example, the Agassiz and Jackson Glaciers in Glacier National Park reached their most forward positions about 1860 during the Little Ice Age.

All of the geological processes, above, have left a complex set of rocks exposed at the surface. For example, in the Rockies of Colorado, there is extensive granite and gneiss dating back to the Ancestral Rockies. In the central Canadian Rockies, the main ranges are composed of the Precambrian mudstones, while the front ranges are composed of the Paleozoic limestones and dolomites. Volcanic rock from the Cenozoic (66 million–1.8 million years ago) occurs in the San Juan Mountains and in other areas. Millennia of severe erosion in the Wyoming Basin transformed intermountain basins into a relatively flat terrain. The Tetons and other north-central ranges contain folded and faulted rocks of Paleozoic and Mesozoic age draped above cores of Proterozoic and Archean igneous and metamorphic rocks ranging in age from 1.2 billion (e.g., Tetons) to more than 3.3 billion years (Beartooth Mountains).

See also
Aspen anomaly
Canadian Rockies
Geology of the Grand Teton area
Sierra Nevada

References

External links
Southern Rockies Geology - J.S. and S.W. Aber, Emporia State University

 
Geology of Colorado
Geology of Montana
Geology of New Mexico
Geology of Wyoming
Rocky Mountains
Rocky Mountains